Chloride is an unincorporated community in Iron County, in the U.S. state of Missouri. Chloride is located on Big Creek along Missouri Route 49. The community is approximately 1.5 miles south of the lead smelter at Glover.

History
A post office called Chloride was established in 1904, and remained in operation until 1953. The community's name is a transfer from Chloride, Arizona, the onetime home of an early settler.

References

Unincorporated communities in Iron County, Missouri
Unincorporated communities in Missouri